George McArdle is an Australian bass guitarist. He came from a violent, abusive background and was drawn to alcohol, fighting, theft and rock music.

McArdle joined the pop-rock group Little River Band in August 1976, replacing Roger McLachlan. McArdle played on their studio albums Diamantina Cocktail and Sleeper Catcher. In January 1979, McArdle left the band to further his Christian studies at a bible college. He is considered a member of the "classic lineup" of Little River Band. This lineup (Graeham Goble, Beeb Birtles, Derek Pellicci, Glenn Shorrock, David Briggs and McArdle) was inducted into the ARIA Hall of Fame in October 2004.

In 2008, McArdle's biography The Man from Little River was written by Denise A. Austin.

References 

Australian bass guitarists
Little River Band members
ARIA Hall of Fame inductees
Living people
Year of birth missing (living people)